Eight ships of the French Navy have borne the name Psyché: 
Psyché (1762), a 3-gun gunboat, deleted from Navy lists in 1764.
Psyché (1766), a frigate, never completed
She was broken up in 1812.
 , a 44-gun frigate
Psyché (1837), a 40-gun frigate, launched but never completed
 , a 40-gun frigate
  (1932), a 
  (1967), a

Sources and references 
 
 Les bâtiments ayant porté le nom de Psyché, netmarine.net

French Navy ship names